Fat Tau Chau Village aka. Fu Tau Chau is a village in the Hang Hau area of Sai Kung District, New Territories, Hong Kong.

Recognised status
Fat Tau Chau is a recognised village under the New Territories Small House Policy.

History
The current Fat Tau Chau Village is a resite village that was relocated together with the nearby Tin Ha Wan Village in the early 1990s. The historical location was on Fat Tong Chau.

References

External links

 Delineation of area of existing village Fu Tau Chau (Hang Hau) for election of resident representative (2019 to 2022)
 Antiquities Advisory Board. Historic Building Appraisal. Tin Hau Temple, Hang Hau Pictures

 

Villages in Sai Kung District, Hong Kong
Hang Hau